Krystian Gergella (8 March 1975 – 29 September 2002) was a Polish footballer who played as a midfielder. Gergella started playing football with the youth sides of Lechia Gdańsk, eventually being promoted to the first team in 1993, playing in the II liga with the team. Gergella made 3 appearances in the league for Lechia during the 1993–94 season, including 2 appearances and a goal in the Polish Cup. Despite being seen as a talented youngster, nothing is known of his footballing career after leaving Lechia. Gergella died on 29 September 2002 after being involved in a car accident.

References

1975 births
2002 deaths
Lechia Gdańsk players
Polish footballers
Association football midfielders
Living people